Eusebio Ojeda (born 1914, date of death unknown) was a Chilean rower. He competed, as a coxswain, in the men's coxed pair event at the 1956 Summer Olympics.

References

External links
 

1914 births
Year of death missing
Chilean male rowers
Olympic rowers of Chile
Rowers at the 1956 Summer Olympics
Place of birth missing